Kehinde Fadipe(born 17 June 1983) is a British-Nigerian actress and writer.

Life
Kehinde Fadipe was born in St Mary's Hospital, London in 1983. She gained a BA (Hons) in English Literature & Language before taking a second degree at the Royal Academy of Dramatic Art which she completed in 2009.

Her first major role was in 2009 when she appeared in the Lynn Nottage's drama Ruined which won the Pulitzer Prize. Nottage's story is based around sexual violence in the Democratic Republic of Congo. In 2011 she took a part in the BBC television crime story The Body Farm which was based on Patricia Cornwell's 1994 book The Body Farm. She joined the third series of the teen drama Misfits where she played Melissa who was the female counterpart of the male character Curtis. Curtis was played by Nathan Stewart-Jarrett.

Her debut novel is being published in 2023 under the title 'In Such Tremendous Heat' with Dialogue Books (Little Brown/Hachette) and 'The Sun Sets in Singapore' with Grand Central Publishing (Hatchette)

She has two children.

References

Nigerian actresses
1983 births
Living people
Actresses from London
Yoruba actresses
Alumni of RADA
Black British actresses